Janne Rasmussen  (born 18 July 1970) is a Danish footballer who played as a midfielder for the Denmark women's national football team. She was part of the team at the inaugural 1991 FIFA Women's World Cup as well as the 1999 FIFA Women's World Cup.

References

External links
 

1970 births
Living people
Danish women's footballers
Denmark women's international footballers
Place of birth missing (living people)
1991 FIFA Women's World Cup players
1999 FIFA Women's World Cup players
Women's association football midfielders